Guy Austin Bristow (born 23 October 1955) is an English retired professional football central defender who played in the Football League for Watford. He later played in Norway for Lillehammer FK.

References 

1955 births
Living people
English footballers
English Football League players
Footballers from Kingsbury, London
Association football central defenders
Watford F.C. players
English expatriate footballers
English expatriate sportspeople in Norway
Expatriate footballers in Norway